Thalia pavonii is a species of plant in the Marantaceae family. It is endemic to Ecuador.  Its natural habitat is subtropical or tropical dry forests.

References

Flora of Ecuador
pavonii
Vulnerable plants
Taxonomy articles created by Polbot
Taxa named by Friedrich August Körnicke